Crimson Death may refer to
Crimson Death (Dungeons & Dragons), a fictional monster
Crimson Death (band), a Peruvian melodic death metal band

See also
Death Crimson OX, a shooting video game